Gramella forsetii is a Gram-negative, strictly aerobic, chemoorganotrophic and heterotrophic bacterium from the genus of Gramella which has been isolated from water from roads from Helgoland near the North Sea.

References

Flavobacteria
Bacteria described in 2017